Tuyệt đỉnh tranh tài is a Vietnamese vocal/singing competition between recording artists, airing on HTV7 at 9:00 pm (UTC+7) prime time slot every Saturdays. The show premiered on April 19, 2014, with Huỳnh Trấn Thành serving as the host. Lê Hoàng is a permanent judge on judging panel, joined by diva Hồng Nhung for the first six weeks of the show and by Ý Lan for the rest of eleven weeks. Also, there is the third guest judge spot to fill. The winner of the show might take home 400,000,000 VND in cash (roughly $18,800). The first season includes 12 episodes. Contestants of the show are known artists in different music genres.

Format 
In time of the show, artists have to adapt one genre each week. They are learning choreography routines, preparing for music style change, rehearsing with music producers and movement coaches etc. so as to capture correct visuals of the music genre. Three judges then give advice for artists' performances and voting lines are open only after all the performances are done. Audience have ten minutes and five messages at most to vote for their favorite. One artist must leave the competition at the end of the night, while the rest is moving on to the next live show until top 2 are determined. On final round, top 2 perform six solo performances. The artist who receive the most vote will be crown the winner, take home the title The Ultimate Entertainer, 400,000,000 VND in cash and so on. The runner-up will earn himself 200,000,000 VND as well.

Original seasons

Season 1 

Tuyệt đỉnh tranh tài 2014 is the first season of Tuyệt đỉnh tranh tài, a Vietnamese adaptation of Stjernekamp/The Ultimate Entertainer franchise. The show is a vocal/singing competition between recording artists, airing on HTV7 at 9:00 pm (UTC+7) prime time slot every Saturdays. It premiered April 19 and is set to conclude on July 5, 2014, with Huỳnh Trấn Thành serving as the host. Lê Hoàng is a permanent judge on judging panel, joined by diva Hồng Nhung for the first six weeks of the show and by Ý Lan for the rest of eleven weeks. Also, there is the third guest judge spot to fill. The winner of the show might take home 400,000,000 VND in cash (roughly $18,800). The first season includes 12 episodes (1 showcase episode, 9 live shows, 1 grand finale and 1 recap episode). Contestants of the show are known artists in different music genres.

Participating artists

Elimination chart 

 The results from week 2 and 3 determined two of participants to be leaving the competition.
 The results from week 6 and 7 determined two of participants to be leaving the competition.
 Favorite contestant of both judge and audience.
 Favorite contestant of judge was voted off by audience.

Season 2 

Tuyệt đỉnh tranh tài 2015 is the second season of Tuyệt đỉnh tranh tài, following success of the first season. The show is a vocal/singing competition between recording artists, which is set to air HTV7 at 9:00 pm (UTC+7) prime time slot every Saturdays. It premiered April 18 and is set to conclude on July 4, 2015, with Huỳnh Trấn Thành serving as the host once more time. Each week, it had a guest host alongside Trấn Thành. The jury have not been introduced yet before April 14, 2015.

Participating artists

Elimination chart (season 2) 

 Favorite contestant of judge(s) was voted off by audience.
 The results of participants to be leaving the competition, are based on the audience voting of the previous week.
 Contestant was voted off (by the audience), but was saved unanimously by judges.
 Contestant landed in the Bottom 2 (by the audience vote), and was judges' favorite.

Syndication

References

External links 

List of television programmes broadcast by HTV

Ho Chi Minh City Television original programming
Vietnamese television series
2010s Vietnamese television series
2014 Vietnamese television series debuts